Tim Frühling (born 29 July 1975 in Wolfenbüttel) is a German disc jockey and Radio personality for Hessischer Rundfunk.

Between 1998 and 2003 hr XXL before working for You FM and between the years of 2000 and 2003 and from 2005 and 2008 Frühling was news broadcaster for the breakfast show. After years of working for radio Frühling made his television debut in 2008 as weather presenter for TV-hr. In 2009 Frühling provided the ARD television commentary for the 2009 Eurovision Song Contest when regular commentator Peter Urban was too ill to attend the contest in Moscow, Frühling continues to be associated with Eurovision by providing the radio commentary for HR Radio and NDR Radio listeners which he has done since 2006.

External links
 Official profile at HR3

1975 births
Living people
Hessischer Rundfunk people
People from Wolfenbüttel
German radio personalities
German television presenters
German LGBT entertainers
German LGBT broadcasters
ARD (broadcaster) people